Fragile is the seventh and final album  studio released by British band Dead or Alive in 2000. The album was originally only released in Japan by independent record company Avex Trax. With thirteen tracks, the album contains some new material as well as re-recordings and remixes of past songs. Also included is a remake of U2's song "Even Better Than the Real Thing", which had previously appeared on a U2 tribute album. The album remained an exclusive in Japan until the worldwide release of the Sophisticated Boom Box MMXVI compilation in 2016.

In 2001 Dead or Alive also released a remix album, Unbreakable, containing further remixes of songs from Fragile.

Track listing
"Hit and Run Lover" – 4:42
"Turn Around & Count 2 Ten" – 5:17 *
"Something in My House" – 4:01 *
"Even Better Than the Real Thing 2000" – 3:07
"I Paralyze" – 5:55
"Isn't It a Pity?" – 4:45
"You Spin Me Round (Like a Record)" – 6:05 *
"Just What I Always Wanted" – 5:16
"My Heart Goes Bang" – 5:05 *
"Lover Come Back to Me" – 5:36 *
"I Promised Myself" – 4:32
"Blue Christmas 2000" – 3:39 *
"Hit and Run Lover (Bonus Hit Remix)" – 4:42

( * ) 2000 remix version (not original)

Chart performance

Personnel
Pete Burns – vocals, production
Jason Alburey – keyboards, guitars, production
Dean Bright – keyboards, keytar, production
Steve Coy – drums, production

References

2000 albums
Dead or Alive (band) albums
Epic Records albums